The Uganda national under-20 football team is the under-20 youth team for national football in Uganda. The team is controlled by the Federation of Uganda Football Associations.

Honours
CECAFA U-20 Championship:
Winners (4): 1973, 2006, 2010, 2020
Runners-up (4): 1981, 1996, 1999, 2003

Current squad
 The following players were called up for the 2022 CECAFA U-20 Championship.
 Match dates: 28 October – 11 November 2022
 Opposition:  and Caps and goals correct as of:''' 26 October 2022

References 

African national under-20 association football teams
under-20